The Flint Bulldogs were a professional hockey team in Flint, Michigan, from 1991 to 1993. They were a part of the Colonial Hockey League (CoHL) and played their home games at the IMA Sports Arena. They compiled an overall record of 47–66–7. After the 1993 season, the Bulldogs relocated to Utica, New York, and became the Utica Bulldogs, but were taken over by the league partway through the 1993–94 season due to mismanagement of general manager Skip Probst. The following season, the league awarded a new team to Utica called the Utica Blizzard.

References

External links
 Season statistics

Ice hockey teams in Flint, Michigan
Ice hockey teams in Michigan
Professional ice hockey teams in Michigan
Defunct United Hockey League teams
Ice hockey clubs established in 1991
Sports clubs disestablished in 1993
1991 establishments in Michigan